"Standing Sex" is a single released by X Japan (then named X) on October 25, 1991.

Summary 
It and "The Last Song" are the only X Japan singles to not appear on one of the band's studio albums. The b-side is an edited version of "Joker", originally on their album Jealousy.

Commercial performance 
The song reached number 4 on the Oricon charts, and charted for 16 weeks. In 1991, with 187,160 copies sold was the 87th best-selling single of the year, being certified Gold by RIAJ.

Track listing

Personnel
 Co-Producer – Naoshi Tsuda
 Mixed by – Rich Breen
 Art Direction and Design – Mitsuo Izumisawa
 Photography – Masanori Kato, Michihiro Ikeda, Hideo Canno

References

X Japan songs
Songs written by Yoshiki (musician)
English-language Japanese songs
1991 singles
1991 songs